Open Window is a 2006 American drama film written and directed by Mia Goldman and starring Robin Tunney.  Lasse Hallström and Todd Field serve as executive producers of the film.

Cast
Joel Edgerton as Peter
Robin Tunney as Izzy
Cybill Shepherd as Arlene
Elliott Gould as John
Scott Wilson as Eddie
Matt Keeslar as the Rapist
Shirley Knight as Dr. Ann Monohan

Release
The film was screened at the 23rd Jerusalem Film Festival in July 2006.

Reception
The film has a 20% rating on Rotten Tomatoes based on five reviews.

John Anderson of Variety gave the film a negative review and wrote that it "goes down like medicine." The Hollywood Reporters Sura Wood commended the cinematography and score, but felt the film was ultimately undermined by the weak script and characters. Matthew Gilbert of The Boston Globe found the film difficult to watch due to its subject matter, but he commended its "powerful message" and the "admirably pared-down performances by Tunney and Edgerton."

References

External links
 
 

Films scored by Cliff Eidelman
Films about rape